Khwaja Hasan Nizami (1878 Delhi-31 July 1955 Delhi) was a Sufi of Chishti Islamic order, a known Urdu essayist and humorist and satirist who wrote many essays for the Mukhzun Akhbar (Magazine). He wrote more than 60 books he also wrote about the incidents of war of 1857 while Mulla Wahidi, writes that he had over five hundred books on an amazing variety of subjects to his credit (quoted in Naqvi, 1978). Being a Sufi he had many disciples and it appeared in his literature.

His maternal grandfather Ghulam Hasan Chisti was a friend and spiritual advisor to Bahadur Shah Zafar and frequently visited the Red Fort. His mother used to tell him the stories of the Mughal family she had heard from her father. He had himself met Kalsum Zamani Begam, Zafar's daughter. He has narrated the tragic stories of Mirza Nasir-ul-Mulk, Zafar's grandson, who eventually became a servant of a British family and later crawled on his knees and begged in Bazar Chitli Kabr. Mirza Kamar Sultan, another of Zafar's grandson also used to beg at the Jama Masjid.

Works 
Nizami "was of Nizamuddin Auliya's known silsilã, and widely honoured in the Muslim world."

Literary Works
Khwaja wrote many books including: 
Fãtami Dãwat-i-Islam (1920)
Gadar ki Subah aur Sham 
Tareekh e Firaun
Krishan Beeti
Madar e Hamdard
Sair e Delhi
Government Aur Khilafat
Ghalib's Diary 
Bahaddur Shah zafar's diary (publisher)
Begumat Kay Ansoo: Dehli Kay Afsanay (also translated as Tears of the Begums, Stories of Survivors of the Uprising of 1857, 2022)
 Ap Biti (autobiography)

Commemoration of Muharram 
As most of the Muslims had migrated to Pakistan after partition in 1947 AD, Delhi had no Shia orator to address the Majlis during Muharram. At this crucial juncture, Khwaja Hasan Nizami filled the gap by addressing Majlis at Panja Shareef. He was also supported by Maulana Ahmad Saeed, Maulana Zubair Qureshi   and Justice Vyas Dev Mishra in his endeavor to ensure sustainability of commemoration of Muharram against odds. Despite Khawaja Hasan Nizami Being part of the Ahl us Sannah wal Jammah.

Dr Majid Deobandi had written a PhD thesis on Khwaja Hasan Nizami.

References

External links 

 Marcia Hermansen, Professor at Loyola University Chicago has compiled a bibliography of Khwaja Hasan Nizami's Publications He also wrote Stories like Beghmat ke Ansuo And Thele Wala ShehzaDa.

1873 births
1955 deaths
Urdu-language writers from British India
Urdu-language writers from India
Indian Sufi saints
Urdu-language essayists
Urdu-language humorists
19th-century Urdu-language writers
Urdu-language religious writers
Indian travel writers
Urdu-language travel writers